is a Japanese former actor, known for his break-out performance in the controversial movie Battle Royale.

Career
His break-out performance was in the controversial movie Battle Royale, in which he played the pacifistic Hiroki Sugimura (Boy #11). Takaoka then moved from muted heroics to active anti-heroism in portrayals of the grittier side of teenage violence, such as in Concrete. The film was based on the events of Junko Furuta's sadistic murder by four youths in 1988.

In 2006, for his role as the introspective Honda in Spring Snow, Takaoka gained a Best Supporting Actor nomination at the Blue Ribbon Awards, a Japanese film event judged by critics.

Takaoka quit acting in 2020 and is now working as a martial arts artist, aside from part time jobs such as a trash collector and at an izakaya

Public image
In July 2011, Takaoka made headlines and attracted much controversy for several comments against the airing of Korean dramas on Japanese television. He stated on Twitter "I used to be indebted to Fuji TV in the past, but now I'm suspicious that they may actually be a Korean network. I'm questioning about what country I'm in as well. It offends me. If anything related to Korea is on broadcast, I just turn the TV off. It troubles me because I feel like I am being brainwashed", and "Since we're in Japan, I would like to see Japanese programs. I get scared every time I hear the word, 'Hallyu'". His comments resulted in a strong public backlash due to his previous role as a Zainichi Korean in the film Pacchigi as well as public protests against the airing of Korean dramas against Fuji TV. Due to the controversy about his statements he was reportedly dropped from his agency following his tweets and his marriage to Aoi Miyazaki whom he stated shared his views was reportedly in jeopardy. However, he later apologized for his statements and retracted his claims of Miyazaki sharing his views.

Personal life
On June 15, 2007, he married Japanese actress Aoi Miyazaki, after dating her for seven years. In December 2011, she divorced him. On August 3, 2020, he announced his retirement from acting. in 2021, he then became a boxer

Filmography
Battle Royale as Hiroki Sugimura (2000)
Blue as Manabu Mizuuchi (2001)
Akashia no michi (2001)
Red Shadow (2001)
Blue Spring (2001)
17-sai (2003)
Spirit (2004)
Concrete as Tatsuo Oosugi (2004)
Break Through! as An-sung Lee (2004)
Tetsujin 28: The Movie (2005)
Spring Snow as Shigekuni Honda (2005)
Sugar and Spice as Yano (2006)
How to Become Myself (Ashita no watashi no tsukurikata) as Hiroyuki Tamura (2007) 
Heat Island (Hîto Airando) (2007)
Crows Zero as Izaki Shun (2007)
Roulette in the Blue Sky (Aozora no ruretto) (2007)
GS Wonderland (2008)
Rookies the Movie: Graduation (Rookies: Sotsugyô) (2009)
Crows Zero 2 (Kurôzu zero II) (2009)
Be Sure to Share (Chanto Tsutaeru) (2009)
Saru Lock The Movie (2010)
Sankaku (2010)
Zatoichi: The Last (2010)
13 Assassins (2010)
What a Wonderful Life!! (Wararaifu!!) (2011)
Bokura ga Ita as Masafumi Takeuchi (2012)
Dare to Stop Us as Nagisa Oshima (2018)

TV
 Taiyō no Kisetsu (2002) (Season of the Sun) (2002)
 Proof of the Man (Ningen no Shomei) (Fuji TV / 2004)
 Slow Dance (Fuji TV / 2005)
 Tokyo Tower (2007)
 Kaze no hate (NHK / 2007)
 Mop Girl (Moppu Gāru) (TV Asahi / 2007)
 The Negotiator (TV Asahi / 2008)
 Rookies (TBS / 2008)
 Saru Lock (NTV / 2009)
 Real Clothes (Riaru kurôzu) (Fuji TV / 2009)
 The Negotiator 2 (Koshonin 2) (TV Asahi / 2009)

Theatre work
Takaoka is also a stage actor and appeared in The Lieutenant of Inishmore (Wee Thomas) by Martin McDonagh in June 2006.

Pilgrim (2003)
Bent (2004)

References

External links
 
 
 News at Manilla Bulletin

1982 births
Living people
Japanese male film actors
Japanese male stage actors
Japanese male television actors
Male actors from Tokyo
Anti-Korean sentiment in Japan
21st-century Japanese male actors
Former Stardust Promotion artists